Hugo Sánchez Márquez (born 11 July 1958) is a Mexican former professional footballer and manager, who played as a forward. A prolific goalscorer known for his spectacular strikes and volleys, he is widely regarded as the greatest Mexican footballer of all time. In 1999, the International Federation of Football History and Statistics voted Sánchez the 26th best footballer of the 20th century, and the best footballer from the CONCACAF region. In 2004, Sánchez was named in the FIFA 100 list of the world's greatest living players. He is the fourth highest scorer in the history of La Liga, the third highest scoring foreign player after Lionel Messi and Cristiano Ronaldo, and is the seventh highest goalscorer in Real Madrid's history. He scored a total of 562 senior career goals for both club and country in 956 matches.

Sánchez began his career playing for Club Universidad Nacional in 1976, and briefly went on loan to the San Diego Sockers of the North American Soccer League in 1979. In 1981, he moved to Spain to play for Atlético Madrid, playing for the Colchoneros for four years before moving to cross-town rivals Real Madrid, where he would spend the best years of his career, winning numerous titles and accolades.

From 1977 to 1994, Sánchez was a member of the national team, gaining 58 caps and scoring 29 goals. He participated in three FIFA World Cup tournaments and was a part of the Mexico team that reached the quarter-finals of the 1986 World Cup. Famous for his acrobatic goal celebrations throughout his club and international career, Sánchez was the first notable exponent of the backflip.

As a manager, he won two consecutive league championships with UNAM. After managing Necaxa, he was announced as coach of the Mexico national football team in 2006, but was fired in March 2008 due to poor results. In 2009, Sánchez was named manager of Almería, and helped to save the club from relegation.

Club career

UNAM
As a teenager, Sánchez played for the Mexico national team at the 1976 Summer Olympics. Having already played in over 80 international matches, Sánchez signed as a youth player at the age of 18 for Pumas de la UNAM, a professional team representing Mexico's national university, where he completed a degree in Dentistry while playing for the first team. Later that year, UNAM managed to win its first championship in the Primera División. Two years later, he became the league's top-scorer with 26 goals.

In 1979, UNAM agreed to exchange players during the off-season with the San Diego Sockers of the North American Soccer League. He played in the NASL during the summer and in the Mexican league during the fall, winter and spring. UNAM loaned Sánchez to the Sockers in 1979 and 1980 where he became a prolific striker for the Sockers, averaging nearly a goal a game.

Sánchez's five seasons with UNAM were during the team's golden years. In 1980–81, his last season with the club, Sánchez and UNAM won its second league championship, a CONCACAF Champions Cup and a Copa Interamericana. During his five years with UNAM, Sánchez scored 104 goals in 200 appearances.

With Hugo's exemplary performances in the Toulon tournament and 1975 Cannes Youth Tournament, he earned his nickname Niño de Oro which translates to Golden boy.

Atlético Madrid
After five successful seasons in Mexico, Sánchez drew the attention of several European sides, including that of English club Arsenal, though eventually signing with Spanish side Atlético Madrid in 1981. It took him a while to find his feet in La Liga, only managing twenty league appearances and scoring eight goals in his first season, but by the 1984–1985 season he was scoring regularly with a team that won the Copa del Rey, finished second in the league and won the Spanish Super Copa. That year, Sánchez won his first Pichichi trophy for being the most prolific scorer in the league, scoring 26 goals.

Real Madrid

On 15 July 1985, Sánchez signed for Real Madrid. It was reported that due to Atlético Madrid's reluctance to anger their fan base with a direct deal with Real, Sánchez was transferred to UNAM back in his home country on 4 July before being signed by Real Madrid, with the contract signing taking place in a bank in Mexico City. He was flown back to Spain and presented to 50,000 fans at the Santiago Bernabéu Stadium on 19 July.

He played alongside the famed group of players known as the La Quinta del Buitre ("Vulture's Cohort"), which consisted of Emilio Butragueño, Manuel Sanchís, Martín Vázquez, Míchel, and Miguel Pardeza. With Los Blancos, Sánchez won five consecutive league titles from 1985 to 1990, a Copa del Rey title in 1989 and the UEFA Cup in 1986. During those five years, Sánchez won four-consecutive Pichichi trophies, becoming the only player in Spanish football history to achieve this without sharing the trophy with any other player in any season, and one of four players to win five Pichichis (the others being Alfredo Di Stéfano, Quini and Messi (who has won 6), scoring 208 goals in 283 games in all competitions. He scored 27 or more goals in four consecutive seasons between 1986 and 1990, including 38 goals in the 1989–90 season, tying the single-season record set in 1951 by Telmo Zarra and earning the European Golden Boot award for the best scorer in Europe. Remarkably, all 38 of these goals were scored with only a single touch. His 38-goal tally stood as a league record until Cristiano Ronaldo surpassed it after scoring 40 goals in the 2010–11 season. In European Cup competitions, Sánchez scored 47 goals in 45 matches.

Later career
In 1992, Sánchez returned to his native Mexico for a season and there he won the 1992 CONCACAF Champions' Cup with Club América before playing for a variety of clubs in Spain, Austria and the USA. He played for Dallas Burn in the inaugural year of Major League Soccer, becoming one of two footballers, along with Roy Wegerle, to play outdoor football in both the NASL and MLS. He finished his career playing for Atlético Celaya, along with Butragueño and Míchel, his old colleagues from Real Madrid.

Retirement
Sánchez retired from Spanish football on 29 May 1997, playing with Real Madrid at the Santiago Bernabéu Stadium. His last official game was during the 1998 World Cup qualifiers, where he touched the ball as a symbol of his retirement.

International career
Sánchez made 58 appearances for Mexico between 1977 and 1994, scoring 29 goals. Prior to representing the senior side, as a teenager he represented Mexico at the 1975 Pan American Games on home soil, where he won a gold medal, and at the 1976 Summer Olympics. He participated in three FIFA World Cup tournaments, making eight World Cup appearances in total, and scoring once. Also, with Chilean Elías Figueroa holds the unique distinction of playing in three alternate tournaments 1978-1986-1994. He helped Mexico win the 1977 CONCACAF Championship to seal qualification for the 1978 FIFA World Cup in Argentina; at the age of 19, he took part in the final tournament, where Mexico lost all three of their group games and suffered a first round elimination.

After Mexico failed to qualify for the 1982 FIFA World Cup in Spain, Sánchez was a part of the Mexico team that reached the quarter-finals of the 1986 World Cup on home soil, losing out to eventual runners-up West Germany in a penalty shootout.  He scored his only World Cup goal during his nation's opening match of the tournament on 3 June, the winning goal in a 2–1 victory over Belgium, although he also missed a penalty in Mexico's second group match against Paraguay, and was later booked, causing him to miss the final group match. Four years later, however, Mexico once again missed out on the final tournament as they were suspended from the 1990 FIFA World Cup in Italy.

Despite his advancing age, he later played a key role in helping Mexico to the final of the 1993 Copa América, at the age of 35; he scored once in a 2–0 victory over Ecuador in the semi-finals, although Mexico eventually finished as runners-up to Argentina. Sánchez later also appeared at the 1994 FIFA World Cup in the United States, his final major tournament, where Mexico suffered a round of 16 elimination; he made his only appearance in the tournament on 19 June, in Mexico's opening match of the competition, a 1–0 defeat to Norway.

Managerial career

Club
In March 2000, Sánchez became manager of UNAM, who were struggling in the league, signing a two-year deal. Although the team went on to have a good campaign under his leadership, differences between the club president and Sánchez resulted in his sacking in August of that year.

After Jimenez Espriu resigned as the club president a year later, the new president, Luis Regueiro, appointed Sánchez as head coach in November 2001.

After building his team up for a number of years, by 2004 Sánchez' Pumas had won everything they played in: Clausura 2004, Apertura 2004, Champion of Champions 2004 and the Santiago Bernabéu Cup. He also became the only manager in history to lead a Mexican team to two consecutive championships in the Mexican Primera División in the "short tournament" format.

The success, however, was short lived. Pumas became the worst team of the tournament the following season and in Winter 2005 were having the worst year in its history. Sánchez decided to resign in November 2005.

Club Necaxa, another Mexican team, signed him as a head coach in 2006, and he also became the coach of the Mexico national team that year following their participation at the 2006 FIFA World Cup.

He became coach of La Liga's Almería in early 2009, but after accomplishing the goal of avoiding relegation from La Liga, and despite on 2 June 2009 the Almeria chairman Alfonso García announcing the renewal of his contract, he was released on 20 December 2009.

Mexico
After briefly managing Club Necaxa, Sánchez was named head coach of the Mexico national team, with the aim of leading Mexico through the qualification process for the 2010 World Cup in South Africa.

During his coaching career especially, Sánchez became known for his volatile temperament and his willingness to speak candidly, often expressing strong emotions and opinions, a trait that engenders equally emotional and strong responses from those he criticizes. He had a long-standing feud with the previous Mexico coach, Ricardo La Volpe.

Sánchez's first match as Mexico coach was a 2–0 loss to the United States in Phoenix, Arizona in February 2007. Sánchez recorded his first victory against Venezuela, a 3–1 win in front of 67,000 fans in San Diego. Hugo's first game in Mexico took place against Paraguay in Monterrey on 25 March 2007, which Mexico won 2–1. A few days later on 28 March 2007, Mexico defeated Ecuador 4–2 in Oakland, California.

In June 2007 Sánchez coached Mexico in the 2007 edition of the Gold Cup, his first official competition. After struggling in the first stages of the tournament, México reached the final 24 June 2007 and lost 2–1 against the US.

On 27 June 2007, in the opening game of the 2007 Copa América held in Venezuela, Sánchez led the Mexico national team to a stunning 2–0 win Brazil, Hugo's first major victory as a coach. After easing through the group stage of the tournament, Hugo led the team to the semi-finals (beating Paraguay 6–0 in the quarter-finals) where they were beaten 3–0 by Argentina. Mexico ended the tournament in third place by defeating Uruguay 3–1.

In August 2007, Sánchez announced that Mexico would permanently, or at least in his time coaching the team, drop their famous green home kit, replacing it with their white away kit, meaning that their new away kit would be red. For this decision, Sánchez was subject of a lot of criticism. The two main arguments against him were that the decision was breaking a long-standing Mexican tradition, yet the strongest critics suggested that he should devote more time to the strategy and training of the Mexico team rather than entertaining himself with superfluous features of the sport.

In March 2008, Sánchez suffered poor results, including draws with Australia and Finland,  and a loss at home in Querétaro against Ecuador's U-23 team. Disappointing results continued in the CONCACAF Olympic Qualification, a draw with Canada and a loss to Guatemala. His only victory was a 5–1 win against Haiti. Mexico were eliminated from the Pre-Olympic qualifying tournament on goal difference.

On 31 March 2008, Hugo Sánchez was fired from his post as Mexico head coach.

Style of play
 Nicknamed Hugol and Pentapichichi, Sánchez was a prolific goalscorer, who usually played as a centre-forward; he is widely regarded as Mexico's greatest-ever footballer, and one of the greatest players of his generation. A quick and mobile striker, with good skills and an eye for goal, he was known for his intelligence, positional sense, movement, and anticipation in the area, and was an accurate and efficient finisher, who was capable of scoring with few touches.

Due to his athleticism, Sánchez was good in the air, despite his diminutive stature, and was also known for his ability to score acrobatic and flamboyant goals from spectacular strikes and volleys from any position on the pitch, both inside or outside the area; his mastery of the "Chilena", or "Bicycle kick", was a result of his own early training in gymnastics, and his goals scored in this manner were later dubbed Huguinas. His trademark was to perform a celebratory somersault followed by a fist pump after each goal he scored, in honour of his sister, who was a gymnast and participated in the Montreal Olympics. Sánchez is considered to be the first noted exponent of the backflip.

According to his FIFA profile, Sánchez is credited as the creator of the scorpion kick, which was later popularised by Colombian goalkeeper René Higuita. Though he regularly practised the trick in training, the Mexican striker never scored a goal with it in an official match.

An accurate penalty taker, Sánchez held the record for most penalties scored in La Liga with 56, until Cristiano Ronaldo broke the record in 2017 after scoring his 57th penalty-kick.

Outside football

Personal life

Hugo Sánchez is the son of Héctor Sánchez, who was also a footballer who played for Asturias F.C. and Atlante. Sánchez is currently married to Isabel (née Martín), and has two children, a son and an older daughter from his previous marriage. His son, Hugo Sánchez Portugal, was also a footballer and played for UNAM and Atlante. He also has two daughters from his current marriage. On 8 November 2014, Sánchez Portugal died from the effects of a gas leak in a Mexico City apartment as stated by the Mexican Red Cross.

In 2006, Sánchez was appointed as the official FIFA/SOS Ambassador for Mexico, joining Wayne Rooney (Ambassador for England), Ruud van Nistelrooy (Netherlands), and fifty others in fund raising for the official 2006 FIFA World Cup Charity.

On 1 September 2007, Sánchez inaugurated a street with his name in Puebla, central Mexico, before a thousand of the locals around there.

Media
As of January 2015, Sánchez is a commentator for ESPN in Mexico and the United States. He had previously served as a guest analyst during their coverage of the 2014 FIFA World Cup before featuring as a regular analyst. He was introduced as an Ultimate Team Icon in the video game, FIFA 20.

Career statistics

Club

International

Scores and results list Mexico's goal tally first, score column indicates score after each Sánchez goal.

Managerial statistics
Last updated 17 June 2019

1Includes results from Liga MX
2Includes only results from 2000 U.S. Cup
3Includes results from Liga MX, Campeón de Campeones, 2003 Copa Libertadores, CONCACAF Champions' Cup 2005 and Trofeo Santiago Bernabeu
4Includes results from 2008 CONCACAF Men's Pre-Olympic Tournament and under-23 international friendly matches
5Includes results from La Liga, Copa del Rey and Trofeo Lagarto de Jaén
6Includes results from Liga MX and Copa MX

Honours

Player
UNAM
Mexican Primera División: 1976–77, 1980–81
CONCACAF Champions' Cup: 1980
Copa Interamericana: 1981

Atlético Madrid
Copa del Rey: 1984–85

Real Madrid
La Liga: 1985–86, 1986–87, 1987–88, 1988–89, 1989–90
Supercopa de España: 1988, 1989, 1990
Copa del Rey: 1988–89
UEFA Cup: 1985–86

América
CONCACAF Champions' Cup: 1992

Linz
First League: 1995–96

Mexico
Pan American Games: 1975
CONCACAF Championship: 1977

Individual
Mexican Primera División Winger of the Tournament: 1977–78, 1978–79
Mexican Primera División Golden Ball: 1978–79
Mexican Primera División Golden Boot: 1978–79
European Golden Shoe: 1990
La Liga top goalscorer: 1984–85, 1985–86, 1986–87, 1987–88, 1989–90
Don Balón Award – Best Foreign Player: 1986–87, 1989–90
CONCACAF Champions' Cup top goalscorer: 1992
Best Sportist of Mexico of the 20th century
IFFHS Best footballer of Mexico of the 20th century
IFFHS Best footballer of CONCACAF of the 20th century
FIFA 100: 2004
Golden Foot Legends Award: 2010
FIFA XI: 1982
IFFHS Legends
Marca Leyenda: 2018
IFFHS CONCACAF Men's Team of All Time: 2021

Managerial
UNAM
Mexican Primera División: Clausura 2004, Apertura 2004
Campeón de Campeones: 2004

Mexico
CONCACAF Gold Cup runners-up: 2007
Copa América third-place: 2007

Individual
Mexican Primera División Manager of the Tournament: 2003–04, 2004–05
La Liga Best Replacement Manager: 2008–09

See also 
 List of men's footballers with 500 or more goals

References

External links
  
 
 Matches in European Cups
 NASL stats
 
 

1958 births
Living people
FIFA 100
FC Dallas players
North American Soccer League (1968–1984) players
Major League Soccer players
San Diego Sockers (NASL) players
Club América footballers
Club Universidad Nacional footballers
Atlante F.C. footballers
Liga MX players
La Liga players
Atlético Madrid footballers
Real Madrid CF players
Rayo Vallecano players
FC Linz players
Atlético Celaya footballers
Olympic footballers of Mexico
Footballers at the 1976 Summer Olympics
1978 FIFA World Cup players
1986 FIFA World Cup players
1994 FIFA World Cup players
1993 Copa América players
2007 Copa América managers
Mexican football managers
Club Universidad Nacional managers
Club Necaxa managers
C.F. Pachuca managers
CONCACAF Championship-winning players
La Liga managers
UD Almería managers
National Autonomous University of Mexico alumni
Footballers from Mexico City
Mexico national football team managers
Mexico international footballers
Mexican expatriate footballers
Mexican footballers
Association football forwards
Mexican expatriate sportspeople in Spain
Mexican expatriate sportspeople in the United States
Pichichi Trophy winners
Expatriate football managers in Spain
Expatriate footballers in Spain
Expatriate soccer players in the United States
UEFA Cup winning players
Pan American Games gold medalists for Mexico
Pan American Games medalists in football
Footballers at the 1975 Pan American Games
Medalists at the 1975 Pan American Games